The Carmelite Monks or Monks of the Most Blessed Virgin Mary of Mount Carmel are a public association within the Diocese of Cheyenne, dedicated to a humble life of prayer.  The Wyoming Carmelites claim loyalty to the Magisterium of the Catholic Church and to the Carmelite charism.  Their life includes strict separation from the world and the living of the cloistered Carmelite spirituality and way of life established by John of the Cross and Teresa of Jesus.  In accord with the Carmelite Rule, they engage in manual labor and the study of Carmelite spirituality in the solitude of the mountains, with the firm hope of attaining to Union with God.

Role of cloistered monks in Carmel
The Carmelite monks are cloistered Carmelite men who dedicate their lives to prayer and the pursuit of virtue so as to be a hidden leaven of grace for the Catholic Church's mission in the world. Their priests are called choir monks since their entire hidden priesthood is devoted to the following: offering daily the Holy Sacrifice of the Mass, the chanting of the Divine Office in the choir and pursuing the heights of the mystical life through personal holiness and contemplative prayer. Though they are completely cloistered, they also share the fruits of their solitary lives by hearing confessions and giving spiritual direction to people who may come to the monastery.

As cloistered Wyoming Carmelites, they are not active friars, but pray for their fellow Carmelites who have that mission. For this reason they do not belong to either the Ancient Observance or Discalced branches of the Carmelite Order.  All Carmelites originated as hermit monks, but the main branches of the order have been mendicant friars since the 13th century.

In one of the first works of the Carmelite Order, The Institutions of the First Monks, written near the beginning of the order, the charism of the Carmelites was laid out as a hidden life of contemplative prayer carried out in the solitary wilderness by a monk. The Carmelite monks follow this same solitary monastic Carmelite charism.

Cloistered Carmelite nuns also consider themselves to be cloistered monastic hermits. Their life and the life of the Carmelite monks' are similar in that both are cloistered Carmelite contemplatives and follow many of the same customs.

Background of the community
The Carmelite monks were founded in 2003 by the authority of Bishop David Ricken in the Roman Catholic Diocese of Cheyenne, Wyoming, with Daniel Mary Schneider as the first and founding Prior of the community.

Schneider was trained for eleven years in a hermitage of the Ancient Observance and through a close relationship with several houses of cloistered Discalced Carmelite nuns. Schneider was clothed as a Carmelite by members of the order and lived in vows in a house of the order for many years.

The Carmelite monks use the suffix M.Carm. to designate membership in their order, which is the abbreviation of the Latin words .  This means 'Monks of Carmel' in English.

Charism
The Carmelite monks' spirituality and life are based on four pillars that are essential to their identity. The first pillar is filial union with the Blessed Virgin; the second, the Rule of St. Albert; the third, the traditional Carmelite Liturgy, and the fourth, the Carmelite spirituality and monastic inspiration of the way of life of Teresa of Jesus and John of the Cross.

The monks live a strict horarium that includes the midnight office, two hours of mental prayer, common rosary, chanted sung mass and manual labor.

A young Carmelite monk, Simon Mary, described his community's charism in this way in a 2008 interview:
Carmelite monks are consecrated to God through the vows of obedience, chastity, and poverty. Our time is spent in prayer and penance for the salvation of souls, interceding for the Church and the world, as well as in the study of Scripture and the fathers and doctors of the Church . . . Our monks live strict constitutional enclosure – we don't leave the monastery at all, . . . with[out] permission from the Bishop.

Traditional liturgy

The Carmelite Monks of Wyoming use the traditional Latin liturgy of the Carmelite Rite, which is similar to the Tridentine Mass. The Carmelite Rite, based on the Rite of the Holy Sepulchre, was used by the Ancient Observance branch of the Carmelite Order from the time of the first hermits on Mount Carmel in the Holy Land in the late 12th century, until Vatican II at which time the Carmelites began to celebrate the ordinary form of the Roman Rite Mass. The first Rule of Carmel was given to the Carmelites by Albert of Jerusalem, the Latin Patriarch of Jerusalem, who in that time was exiled in the city of Acre, Israel, from which place Mount Carmel was visible to the south.

New Mount Carmel

Separation from the world for contemplative prayer is essential to the life of the Carmelite monks, their monasteries are founded in the mountains to ensure geographical enclosure. In modern times where noise abounds, the monks desire true silence and an atmosphere of natural solitude.  The monks explain how the mountains provide this: "In the mountains, often wild and remote, the soul can make a swift journey towards union with God; the beauty of the wilderness alone raises the mind and heart to the Eternal Father who created the things of this world.  In the mountains the Carmelite monks will at last be in a place conducive to their life and in keeping with their Holy Rule."

Thus Carmelite monks have founded the New Mount Carmel, where the original Carmelite charism is being lived in the mountains of Wyoming. This reflects the continual effort of Carmelites throughout the centuries to return to the eremitical life of a hermit in the mountains in imitation of Elijah from the Book of Kings in the Old Testament.  The Carmelite monks are nearing completion of their Gothic monastery in the Rocky Mountains.

Mystic Monk Coffee

The Carmelite monks are known for roasting and selling gourmet coffee under the name Mystic Monk Coffee.  The Wyoming Carmelites' coffee has won awards from famous coffee reviewers and is known for its small batch quality and freshness.  The Carmelite monks' Mystic Monk Coffee business was established to help support the Carmelite monks' monastery in the mountains of Wyoming.

Accusations and investigation

In May of 2020, Augustine Inferrera, who spent four weeks as a postulant with the community, wrote a 49-page report addressed to the bishop of Cheyenne and had it published by traditionalist news website Church Militant. The report accused the monastery of abuse and dysfunction that he allegedly experienced and witnessed during his time there, including one instance where a brother, Paul Bennier, pointed a masonry trawl at him, and another where the same brother pushed him against a door while gripping his neck. 

Inferrera reported the latter incident to the Park County Sheriff's Office and as a result Bennier was charged with simple assault. He pled no contest to the charge, was found guilty, and was sentenced to six months probation and a fine which was waived due to his inability to pay. Bennier was chastised by the prior for the incident and expressed remorse to Inferrera and to the officer who interviewed him.  

Additionally, Inferrera accused the monks of not praying enough. Certain parts of this report were also endorsed by Richard Minson, who has claimed to be a former member of the monastery, and has also claimed to have spent as much as two weeks there.

The bishop of Cheyenne subsequently sent a letter in September of 2020 in reply to Augustine Inferrera informing him that he had conducted an investigation of the monastery and had directed the monks to make changes to address certain issues and that he would supervise these changes.

See also
 Constitutions of the Carmelite Order

References and notes

External links
Carmelite Monks Home Page | Carmel of the Immaculate Heart of Mary
Carmelite Monks on the New Mount Carmel
Carmelite Monks – "Chants of Carmel"
The Carmelite Vocation

 
 
Most Blessed Virgin Mary of Mount Carmel, Monks of the
Ecclesia Dei
Carmelite spirituality
Most Blessed Virgin Mary of Mount Carmel, Monks of the